Ralf Walter (born 15 March 1958, in Andernach) is a German politician of the Social Democratic Party of Germany  who served as a Member of the European Parliament from 1994 until 2009. In Parliament, he served as vice-chair of the Committee on Budgets. He was also a substitute for the Committee on Budgetary Control and the Committee on Development.

Education
 Graduated in social work

Career
 1980–1990: Chairman of the Cochem SPD
 1988–2000: Chairman of the Cochem-Zell Subdistrict SPD
 Member of the SPD District Executive
 since 2003: Chairman of the Rheinland-Pfalz SPD Party Council
 1979–1996: Member of the Cochem Municipal Council
 1984–2000: District Councillor
 1991–1994: Member of the Bundestag
 1994–2009: Member of the European Parliament

Decorations
 Bundesverdienstkreuz

External links
  
 
 

1958 births
Living people
People from Andernach
Members of the Bundestag for Rhineland-Palatinate
Social Democratic Party of Germany MEPs
MEPs for Germany 1994–1999
MEPs for Germany 1999–2004
MEPs for Germany 2004–2009
Recipients of the Cross of the Order of Merit of the Federal Republic of Germany
Members of the Bundestag for the Social Democratic Party of Germany